The following lists events in the year 2022 in Belize.

Incumbents 

 Monarch: Elizabeth II (until 8 September), then Charles III 
 Prime Minister: Johnny Briceño
 Governor-General: Dame Froyla Tzalam
 Chief Justice of Belize: Michelle Arana (until 2 September); Louise Blenman onwards

Events 

Ongoing — COVID-19 pandemic in Belize

 1 January – 2022 New Year Honours.
 14 March - Commonwealth Day.
 1 August - Emancipation Day.
 12 August - A Belize-flagged ship departs Chornomorsk for Turkey, becoming the first wheat export from Ukraine under a United Nations-brokered deal.
 10–21 September — September Celebrations, including Battle of St. George's Caye Day (1798) and Independence Day (1981).
 8 September – Accession of Charles III as King of Belize following the death of Queen Elizabeth II.
 9 September – Church bells across Belize toll at 8am to symbolise the beginning of the reign of Belize's new monarch – King Charles III.
 19 September – A national holiday is observed on the day of the funeral of Elizabeth II, Queen of Belize. The Governor-General attends the Queen's state funeral in the United Kingdom.

Deaths 

 10 February – Sir Manuel Esquivel, politician (b. 1940)
 6 April - Melvin Hulse, politician (b. 1947)
 10 July - Theodore Aranda, politician (b. 1934)
 8 September - Elizabeth II, Queen of Belize (b. 1926)

See also 

 COVID-19 pandemic in North America
 2022 Atlantic hurricane season

References 

 
2020s in Belize
Years of the 21st century in Belize
Belize
Belize